Volleyball at the 2007 Southeast Asian Games was held 2 venues

Indoor Volleyball: Gymnasium 2, His Majesty the King's 80th Birthday Anniversary Stadium (5 December 2007), Nakhon Ratchasima, Thailand
Beach Volleyball: Beach Volleyball Stadium, His Majesty the King's 80th Birthday Anniversary Stadium (5 December 2007), Nakhon Ratchasima, Thailand

Medal table

Medalists

Beach volleyball

Indoor volleyball

External links
Southeast Asian Games Official Results

2007 Southeast Asian Games events
2007 in volleyball
Volleyball at the Southeast Asian Games